Dhimitër Çani (1904 in Korçë, Manastir Vilayet, Ottoman Empire – 1990) was an Albanian sculptor. He graduated at the Accademia di Belle Arti di Roma in Rome, Italy.

References

1904 births
1990 deaths
20th-century Albanian sculptors
Albanian expatriates in Italy
Albanian sculptors
People from Korçë
People from Manastir vilayet